Aleksandra Alla Anatolyevna Ivanova (born 9 July 1949) is a retired female tennis player who competed for the Soviet Union.

She played in singles at the French Open in 1971. In the first round, 5th seeded West German Helga Masthoff withdrew from the match and Ivanova advanced to the second round. She lost to the British player Winnie Show in the second round. 

Ivanova played tennis in the 1960s and 70s. She retired from professional tennis in the mid-70s.

Career finals

Singles (7–3)

Doubles (10–5)

References

External links
 

1949 births
Living people
Soviet female tennis players